The following events occurred in December 1988:

December 1, 1988 (Thursday)
 In Ordzhonikidze, North Ossetian Autonomous Soviet Socialist Republic, Russian Soviet Federative Socialist Republic, Soviet Union, four men and a woman hijack a bus carrying 30 schoolchildren, a teacher and a driver and demand US$2 million in ransom and a cargo plane to leave the country.
 Carlos Salinas de Gortari takes office as President of Mexico.

 The first World AIDS Day is held.
 STS-27: NASA postpones the planned launch of Space Shuttle Atlantis from Kennedy Space Center in Florida due to weather.
 Born:
 Ashley Monique Clark, American television actress; in Brooklyn, New York City
 Nadia Hilker, German actress; in Munich, Bavaria, West Germany
 Tyler Joseph, American singer; in Columbus, Ohio
 Zoë Kravitz, American actress, singer and model; in Los Angeles, California
 Dan Mavraides, Greek-American professional basketball player; in Boston, Massachusetts
 Taione Vea, Tonga rugby union player; in Auckland, New Zealand
 Died:
 J. Vernon McGee, 84, American Presbyterian minister and theologian, heart failure
 Alun Oldfield-Davies , 83, Welsh broadcaster and public servant

December 2, 1988 (Friday)
 A cyclone in Bangladesh leaves 5 million homeless and thousands dead.
 Benazir Bhutto is sworn in as Prime Minister of Pakistan, becoming the first woman to head the government of an Islam-dominated republic.
 Agreeing to the bus hijackers' demands, the Soviet government gives them $2 million and an Aeroflot Ilyushin-76 cargo plane with a crew of eight to fly it. After the plane takes off from Mineralnyye Vody, the hijackers decide to fly to Israel rather than Pakistan or Iraq, as they had intended. The plane lands at a military airstrip near Ben Gurion Airport in Lod, Israel, where the hijackers surrender. Yitzhak Rabin, the Israeli Minister of Defense, criticizes the Soviet response to the hijacking, saying, "I must admit I can't understand how they could manage to leave the Soviet Union without the Soviet authorities doing anything to prevent it."

 STS-27: At 9:30:34 a.m. Eastern Standard Time, NASA launches Space Shuttle Atlantis on a classified mission. Unbeknownst to the five-man crew, 85 seconds after liftoff, falling insulation from one of the Solid Rocket Boosters (SRBs) severely damages the shuttle's thermal protection system. A few hours later, astronaut Mike Mullane uses the shuttle's robot arm to deploy the mission's cargo, the Lacrosse 1 satellite (also known as ONYX) for the U.S. National Reconnaissance Office and the Central Intelligence Agency. In a 2001 interview, shuttle commander Robert L. Gibson will reveal that the satellite experienced a problem after deployment which required that the shuttle rendezvous with it for the issue to be corrected. Gibson's comments and confusion over the identification of the 100th U.S. spacewalk during the STS-98 mission in February 2001 will lead to speculation that STS-27 crewmembers—possibly astronauts Jerry L. Ross and William Shepherd—conducted a classified spacewalk to repair the satellite.
 Presidential transition of George H. W. Bush: U.S. President-elect George H. W. Bush and his defeated opponent in the presidential election, Massachusetts Governor Michael Dukakis, hold a joint press conference.
 Born:
 Edward Windsor, Lord Downpatrick, English fashion designer; in London, England
 Alfred Enoch, British actor; in London, England
 Fuse ODG (born Nana Richard Abiona), English rapper; in Tooting, South London, England
 Stephen McGinn, Scottish footballer; in Glasgow, Scotland
 Soniya Mehra, Indian Bollywood actress
 Died:
 Karl-Heinz Bürger, 84, German SS and police leader
 Tata Giacobetti (born Giovanni Giacobetti), 66, Italian singer and jazz musician (Quartetto Cetra), heart attack
 Lloyd Rees AC CMG, 93, Australian landscape painter

December 3, 1988 (Saturday)
 In the United Kingdom, Parliamentary Under-Secretary of State for Public Health Edwina Currie provokes outrage by stating that most of Britain's egg production is infected with the salmonella bacteria, causing an immediate nationwide decrease in egg sales.

 STS-27: Mission Control requests that the shuttle crew use Atlantis robot arm to photograph the heat shield under the shuttle's right wing. According to his own later account, when shuttle commander Robert L. Gibson sees the tile damage on the camera monitor, he thinks, "We are going to die." Due to the classified nature of the mission, the crew is required to use an encryption technique to send video of the damage to mission control, causing ground controllers to underestimate the severity of the damage and inform the crew that it is no worse than on previous flights.
 Born: Melissa Aldana, Chilean tenor saxophone player; in Santiago, Chile
 Kevin Clark, American child actor and musician; in Highland Park, Illinois (d. 2021, bicycle accident)

December 4, 1988 (Sunday)
 Riding his motorcycle without a helmet, American actor Gary Busey has a near-fatal accident, sustaining a head injury that places him in a coma for four weeks. He will regain consciousness on January 6, 1989, and will subsequently recover and resume his acting career.
 Born: Yeng Constantino, Filipina pop rock singer-songwriter; in Rodriguez, Rizal, Philippines
 Miki Kanie, Japanese Olympic archer; in Gifu, Gifu Prefecture, Japan
 Mario Maurer (a.k.a. Nutthawuth Suwannarat), Thai model and actor; in Bangkok, Thailand
 Andriy Pylyavskyi, Ukrainian footballer; in Kyiv, Ukrainian Soviet Socialist Republic, Soviet Union
 Died: Osman Achmatowicz, 89, Polish chemist and academic
 Jan Mesdag (born Jan Henry de Vey Mestdagh), 34, Dutch singer and cabaret artist, complications from AIDS
 Fernand Mourlot, 93, French printer and publisher
 Joseph Zimmerman, M.S.F., 64, Swiss Catholic prelate, bishop of the Roman Catholic Diocese of Morombe in Madagascar, fall from stairs

December 5, 1988 (Monday)
 STS-27: The day before reentry, shuttle commander Gibson, still convinced that there is a strong possibility he and his crew will die tomorrow, tells them to relax, saying, "No reason to die all tensed up."
All four crewmen are lost.
 Born: Joanna Rowsell, English Olympic champion cyclist; in Carshalton, Greater London, England
 Died: Einar Forseth, 96, Swedish artist
 Monica Beatrice McKenzie, 83, New Zealand dietitian

December 6, 1988 (Tuesday)
 The Australian Capital Territory is granted self-government by the Australian Capital Territory (Self-Government) Act 1988.
 Presidential transition of George H. W. Bush: U.S. President-elect Bush nominates Thomas R. Pickering as U.S. Ambassador to the United Nations, despite reports that Pickering helped arrange a secret donation to the Nicaraguan Contras when he was U.S. Ambassador to El Salvador. Pickering is only the second career diplomat ever named to the post.

 STS-27: Space Shuttle Atlantis and its crew return safely to Earth, surviving the damage to the orbiter's heat shield and landing at Edwards Air Force Base in California at 3:36:11 p.m. Pacific Standard Time. During reentry, Gibson keeps a close eye on a gauge that would indicate a developing problem, saying afterwards that this would have given him "at least 60 seconds to tell mission control what I thought of their analysis." 707 of the shuttle's heat shield tiles prove to have been damaged; one tile near the shuttle's nose was completely lost, causing a metal antenna anchor plate underneath it to become partly melted during reentry. Had the damage been in a different location, Atlantis would have been destroyed during its return to Earth, as Space Shuttle Columbia will be after sustaining similar damage in 2003.
 Born: Laurent Bourgeois and Larry Nicolas Bourgeois, Les Twins, French identical twin brother new style hip-hop dancers; in Sarcelles, Val-d'Oise, France
 Adam Eaton, American Major League Baseball outfielder; in Springfield, Ohio
Ravindra Jadeja, Indian international cricketer; in Navagam Ghed, Jamnagar district, Saurashtra, Gujarat, India
 Sandra Nurmsalu, Estonian musician; in Alavere, Harju County, Soviet-occupied Estonia, Soviet Union
 Sabrina Ouazani, French actress; in Saint-Denis, Seine-Saint-Denis, France
 Nils Petersen, German professional and Olympic footballer; in Wernigerode, East Germany
 Nobunaga Shimazaki, Japanese voice actor; in Shiogama, Miyagi Prefecture, Japan
 Johnny Strange, English performance artist, street performer and stunt performer; in Lancashire, England
 Died: Timothy Patrick Murphy, 29, American actor, AIDS
 Roy Orbison, 52, American rock musician, heart attack
 Veerendra (aka Veerinder Singh; born Subhash Dhadwai), 40, Indian film actor, writer, producer and director, is shot along with actress Manpreet Kaur and cameraman Pritam Singh Balla while filming a scene for the movie Jatt Te Zameen on location in Talwandi Kalan, Punjab, India. Veerendra dies at the scene; the other two victims survive.

December 7, 1988 (Wednesday)

 1988 Armenian earthquake: In Soviet Armenia, the  6.8 Spitak earthquake kills nearly 25,000, injures 31,000 and leaves 400,000 homeless. The town of Spitak is completely destroyed.
 Singing Revolution: The Estonian language replaces Russian as the official language of the Estonian SSR.
 In South Africa, anti-apartheid revolutionary Nelson Mandela is transferred from the Constantiaberg Clinic, the second of two hospitals where he has been treated for tuberculosis, to a house at Victor Verster Prison, where he will serve the last 14 months of his imprisonment until his release on February 11, 1990.
 Mikhail Gorbachev, General Secretary of the Communist Party of the Soviet Union and Chairman of the Presidium of the Supreme Soviet of the Soviet Union, makes an official visit to the United States, meeting with U.S. President Ronald Reagan and President-elect Bush at the Governors Island Summit in New York City. Gorbachev also promises major cuts in defense spending in a speech at the United Nations before cutting his visit short and flying home due to the earthquake in Armenia.
 In his apartment on the Upper West Side of Manhattan, New York City, American visual artist Chuck Close collapses due to pain. He is able to present an award at the residence of the Mayor of New York City that evening, but then goes to the hospital, where he experiences a convulsion and becomes paralyzed. Due to a blood clot damaging his spinal cord, Close will continue to have limited mobility, but will develop a new artistic style in the process of learning to paint again.
 Born: Juan Abarca, Chilean footballer; in San Vicente de Tagua Tagua, Chile
 Nathan Adrian, American Olympic champion swimmer; in Bremerton, Washington
 Emily Browning, Australian actress; in Melbourne, Victoria, Australia
 Angelina Gabueva, Russian tennis player; in Ordzhonikidze, North Ossetian Autonomous Soviet Socialist Republic, Russian SFSR, Soviet Union
 James Marshall, New Zealand rugby union player; in Auckland, New ZealandDied: Christopher Connelly, 47, American actor, lung cancer
 Dorothy Jordan, 82, American actress, congestive heart failure
 Peter Langan, 47, Irish restaurateur, injuries from October fire

December 8, 1988 (Thursday)
 The six-man crew of the Soviet space station Mir – Soviet cosmonauts Vladimir Georgiyevich Titov, Musa Manarov, Valeri Polyakov, Aleksandr Aleksandrovich Volkov and Sergei Krikalev and French spationaut Jean-Loup Chrétien – are forced to cut short a teleconference with diplomats from 47 countries due to preparations for the following day's spacewalk.
 Six people, including the pilot, die and 50 are injured as a result of the 1988 Remscheid A-10 crash in Remscheid, West Germany.
 The British government announces that it will close North East Shipbuilders with the loss of 2,400 jobs, bringing an end to the 600-year-old shipbuilding industry in Sunderland, England.
 Surface-to-air missiles shoot down an American DC-7 carrying crop-dusting insecticides from Dakar, Senegal, to Agadir, Morocco, and damage a second DC-7. All five crewmembers of the downed plane are killed.

 U.S. President Ronald Reagan gives his final press conference in the East Room of the White House before leaving office on January 20, 1989. Reagan begins the press conference by joking to reporters, "Got to stop meeting like this." He also expresses condolences to the Soviet Union over the Armenian earthquake. When asked whether he trusts Mikhail Gorbachev, Reagan emphasizes the need to "trust but verify".
 U.S. Supreme Court Associate Justice William J. Brennan Jr. is hospitalized with pneumonia at Bethesda Naval Hospital.
 A U.S. military CH-47 Chinook helicopter participating in joint Honduran-U.S. maneuvers crashes near La Ceiba, Honduras, killing all five people aboard.
 Born: Ahn Byung-keon, South Korean footballer; in Seoul, South Korea
 Denis Biryukov, Russian volleyball player; in Volgograd, Russian SFSR, Soviet Union
 Marcus Gilchrist, National Football League safety; in High Point, North Carolina
 Linnea Liljegärd, Swedish footballer; in Arvika, Sweden
 Philip Major, Canadian racing driver; in Ottawa, Ontario, Canada
 Damien Marcq, French footballer; in Boulogne-sur-Mer, France
 Ferdinand Tille, German volleyball player; in Mühldorf, West Germany
 Simon van Velthooven, New Zealand Olympic track cyclist and America's Cup sailor; in Palmerston North, New Zealand
 Jerry Vandam, French footballer; in Lille, France
 Veronika Zvařičová, Czech Olympic biathlete; in Krnov, Czechoslovakia
 Nirmal Bharath Kumar, Engineer, in Salem, Tamil Nadu, India
 Died: Airini Grennell, 78, New Zealand singer, pianist and broadcaster
 John Joe McGirl, 67, Irish politician, chief of staff of the Irish Republican Army
 Sir Andrew McKee, 86, Royal Air Force officer
 Gene Quill, 60, American jazz alto saxophonist (Phil and Quill)
 Hellmuth Reymann, 96, World War II German Army officer
 Anne Seymour, 79, American character actress
 Ulanhu, 80, Chinese general and politician

December 9, 1988 (Friday)

 Spationaut Chrétien and cosmonaut Volkov conduct a spacewalk from Mir, the first EVA in history involving a spacewalker (Chrétien) who is not a member of the Soviet or U.S. space program. They install the Enchantillons and ERA experiments on the exterior of Mir; when ERA fails to deploy properly, Volkov kicks it, causing it to unfold.
 The last Dodge Aries and Plymouth Reliant roll off the assembly line in a Chrysler factory in the United States.
 Former Philippine president Ferdinand Marcos is hospitalized at St. Francis Medical Center in Honolulu, Hawaii, for treatment of congestive heart failure.
 Born: Pietro Aradori, Italian professional basketball player; in Brescia, Italy
 Kwadwo Asamoah, Ghanaian footballer; in Accra, Ghana
 Adam Gettis, National Football League guard
 Ji Liping, Chinese Olympic swimmer; in Shanghai County, Shanghai, China
 Kim Kum-ok, North Korean Olympic long-distance runner and politician; in Pyongyang, North Korea
 Georges Mandjeck, Cameroonian footballer; in Douala, Cameroon
 Denarius Moore, National Football League wide receiver; in Tatum, Texas
 Travian Robertson, National Football League defensive end; in Laurinburg, North Carolina
 Korey Toomer, National Football League linebacker; in Las Vegas, Nevada
 Veronika Vítková, Czech Olympic biathlete; in Vrchlabí, Czechoslovakia
 Rhys Webb, Welsh rugby union player; in Bridgend, Wales
 Robbie Weir, Northern Irish footballer; in Belfast, Northern Ireland
 Died: Wally Borrevik, 67, American professional basketball player
 Maria De Matteis, 90, Italian costume designer

December 10, 1988 (Saturday)
 The naked body of 27-year-old American mathematician Scott Johnson is discovered at the bottom of the cliffs at North Head, New South Wales, Australia (near Manly, New South Wales). The death will be ruled a suicide, but will be reinvestigated in the 21st century as a homophobic hate crime due to the persistence of Johnson's brother, Steve Johnson. 49-year-old Scott Price of Sydney will be arrested in May 2020 for Johnson's murder.
 1988 Armenian earthquake: The Soviet Union declares today a national day of mourning in the wake of Wednesday's earthquake in Armenia. General Secretary Gorbachev tours the damaged cities.
 Approximately 3000 people attend a peaceful rally in Prague, Czechoslovakia, marking the 40th anniversary of the Universal Declaration of Human Rights, the first rally in the city's third district in almost 20 years. The district will ban such rallies again at a meeting on December 22.
 James W. Black, Gertrude B. Elion and George H. Hitchings win the Nobel Prize in Physiology or Medicine "for their discoveries of important principles for drug treatment."
All five crewmembers board a life raft, but captain Stan Michna and crewman Gary Heeney are swept off the raft by another large wave and are lost. The three survivors are rescued by the fishing vessel American Beauty.
 Born: Wilfried Bony, Ivorian footballer; in Bingerville, Ivory Coast
 Pak Chol-min, North Korean international footballer; in Pyongyang, North Korea
 Neven Subotić, Serbian footballer; in Banja Luka, Socialist Republic of Bosnia and Herzegovina, Socialist Federal Republic of Yugoslavia
 Died: Richard S. Castellano, 55, American actor
 Anthony Cottrell , 81, New Zealand rugby union player
 Johnny Lawrence, 77, English cricketer and coach
 Dorothy de Rothschild (born Dorothy Mathilde Pinto), 93, English philanthropist and activist

December 11, 1988 (Sunday)
 1988 Armenian earthquake: An Ilyushin Il-76 cargo plane carrying rescue workers to Leninakan, a city devastated by the earthquake, crashes into the side of a mountain, killing 77 people.
 An explosion at an illegal fireworks shop at the La Merced Market in Mexico City sets off multiple explosions and fires, killing over 60 people.
 Born: Tim Southee, New Zealand international cricketer; in Whangarei, Northland Region, New Zealand
 Died: Frank S. Pepper, 78, British comics writer

December 12, 1988 (Monday)
 The Clapham Junction rail crash in London kills 35 people and injures 484.
 STS-27: At the Monday morning astronaut meeting in Houston, Texas, mission commander Robert L. Gibson amuses the military astronauts present and disgusts the civilians by joking that, although he still cannot reveal details of the shuttle's payload, "I can say Armenia was its first target! And we only had the weapon set on stun!"
 Born: Kévin Bru, French footballer; in Paris, France
 Hahm Eun-jung, South Korean singer and actress; in Seoul, South Korea
 Isaac John, New Zealand rugby league footballer; in Tokoroa, Waikato, New Zealand
 Died: June Tarpé Mills, 70, American comics artist and writer

December 13, 1988 (Tuesday)

 Angolan Civil War: In Brazzaville, Congo, representatives from the governments of Angola, Cuba and South Africa sign the Brazzaville Protocol, mandating the withdrawal of Cuban and South African troops from Angola and paving the way for Namibia's independence through the Tripartite Accord.
 The Troubles in Portadown: 31-year-old Protestant civilian John Corry, a British Army and Royal Ulster Constabulary contractor, is shot and killed by the Irish Republican Army at his garage in Portadown, County Armagh, Northern Ireland.
 Born: Darcy Blake, Welsh footballer; in New Tredegar, Wales
 Rickie Fowler, American professional golfer; in Murrieta, California
 Paul Johnston, English cricketer; in Hartlepool, County Durham, England
 James Tamou, New Zealand rugby league footballer; in Palmerston North, New Zealand
 Died: André Jaunet, 77, French flutist, liver cancer
 Brynmor John, 54, Welsh Labour politician, heart attack
 Roy Urquhart (born Robert Elliot Urquhart), 87, British Army officer

December 14, 1988 (Wednesday)
 At 12:00 a.m. on the night of December 13, the RTVE broadcast signal cuts out, beginning the 1988 Spanish general strike, called by the Workers' Commissions and Unión General de Trabajadores trade unions against the economic policies of the government of Prime Minister Felipe González. The strike brings Spain to a complete standstill for 24 hours, with 95% of the country's workers taking part. The strike will force the González government to withdraw its controversial "Plan de Empleo Juvenil" (Youth Employment Plan) and negotiate with the workers over their additional demands.
 After Yasser Arafat renounces violence, the U.S. says it will open dialogue with the Palestine Liberation Organization (PLO).
 Born: Nicolas Batum, French professional and Olympic basketball player; in Lisieux, France
 Nate Ebner, National Football League safety and special teamer and Olympic rugby sevens player; in Columbus, Ohio
 Vanessa Hudgens, American actress and singer; in Salinas, California
 Hayato Sakamoto, Japanese professional and Olympic champion baseball shortstop; in Itami, Hyōgo, Japan
 Died: Stuart Symington, 87, American politician, United States Senator from Missouri

December 15, 1988 (Thursday)
 Born: Floyd Ayité, French footballer; in Bordeaux, France
 Boaz van de Beatz (born Boaz de Jong), Dutch-Israeli record producer and DJ
 Emily Head, English actress; in Fulham, London, England
 Steven Nzonzi, French footballer; in La Garenne-Colombes, France

December 16, 1988 (Friday)
 A Mitsubishi MU-2 Marquise air taxi operated by Broughton Air Services crashes at Sturt Meadows Station in Western Australia. All 10 people aboard are killed.
 A series of burglaries take place and a man is murdered during the early hours around the M25 motorway in England, beginning the M25 Three case, later to be considered a miscarriage of justice.
 Edwina Currie resigns as Parliamentary Under-Secretary of State for Public Health.
 The Troubles in Downpatrick: 36-year-old Protestant John Moreland, a member of the Ulster Defence Regiment, is shot and killed by the Irish Republican Army while delivering coal off-duty in Downpatrick, County Down, Northern Ireland.
 The American film Rain Man, starring Tom Cruise and Dustin Hoffman, is released. It will win four Academy Awards, including Best Picture.
 Presidential transition of George H. W. Bush: U.S. President-elect Bush announces his nomination of John Tower, a former U.S. Senator from Texas and former chair of the Senate Armed Services Committee, to be his Secretary of Defense. The U.S. Senate will reject Tower's nomination on February 21, 1989.
 Lyndon LaRouche, a perennial candidate for U.S. President, is convicted of mail fraud.
 In Virginia Beach, Virginia, 16-year-old Nicholas Elliot, a student at Atlantic Shores Christian School, shoots and kills 41-year-old teacher Karen Farley and wounds 37-year-old teacher Sam Marino before his gun jams and teacher Hutch Matteson tackles and disarms him. Authorities discover three Molotov cocktails in Elliot's locker and pipe bomb materials in his bookbag. Elliot will be sentenced to life in prison in December 1989.
 Born: Robin Cheong, New Zealand Olympic taekwondo athlete; in Uijeongbu, South Korea
 Mats Hummels, German footballer; in Bergisch Gladbach, West Germany
 Gael Mackie, Canadian Olympic artistic gymnast; in Vancouver, British Columbia, Canada
 Park Seo-joon, South Korean actor and singer; in Seoul, South Korea
 Anna Popplewell, English actress; in London, England
 David Simón, Spanish footballer (born David Simón Rodríguez Santana); in Las Palmas de Gran Canaria, Spain
 Died: John Cameron, 90, New Zealand cricketer
 Hunter Hendry, 93, Australian cricketer
 Ryōhei Koiso (born Ryohei Kishigami), 85, Japanese artist
 Sylvester (born Sylvester James Jr.), 41, American singer-songwriter, complications from HIV/AIDS

December 17, 1988 (Saturday)
 Born: Liisa Ehrberg, Estonian racing cyclist
 Grethe Grünberg, Estonian ice dancer; in Tallinn, Estonian SSR, Soviet Union
 Kris Joseph, Canadian National Basketball Association player; in Montreal, Quebec, Canada
 Amélie Lacoste, Canadian figure skater; in Montreal, Quebec, Canada
 Steve Rapira, New Zealand rugby league footballer; in Hamilton, Waikato, New Zealand
 David Rudisha, Kenyan Olympic champion middle-distance runner; in Kilgoris, Narok County, Kenya
 Craig Sutherland, Scottish footballer; in Edinburgh, Scotland
 Rin Takanashi, Japanese film and television actress; in Chiba Prefecture, Japan
 Died: Jerry Hopper (born Harold Hankins Hopper), 81, American film and television director, heart disease

December 18, 1988 (Sunday)
 In Soweto, South Africa, Jerry Richardson, the coach of the Mandela United Football Club (MUFC), stabs and kills Koekie Zwane (real name Pricilla Mosoeu), girlfriend of a member of the football club. MUFC members may have assisted Richardson in the killing. The MUFC is a vigilante group associated with Winnie Madikizela-Mandela, whom Richardson will later accuse of ordering him to kill Zwane on suspicion of her being an informer.
 Former Philippine president Ferdinand Marcos is released from St. Francis Medical Center in order to receive 24-hour medical care at his home.
 Born: Lizzie Deignan (born Elizabeth Mary Armitstead), English professional and Olympic racing cyclist; in Otley, West Yorkshire, England
 Seth Doege, American and Canadian football quarterback and coach; in San Angelo, Texas
 Erica Rivera, American actress and singer; in Philadelphia, Pennsylvania
 Brianne Theisen-Eaton (born Brianne Theisen), Canadian Olympic track and field athlete; in Saskatoon, Saskatchewan, Canada
 Imad Wasim (born Syed Imad Wasim Haider), Pakistani cricketer; in Swansea, Glamorgan, Wales
 Died: R. Arumugam, 35, Malaysian footballer, traffic collision
 Niyazi Berkes, 80, Turkish Cypriot sociologist

December 19, 1988 (Monday)
 1988 Cannes and Nice attacks: At about 3:30 a.m., French far-right extremists carry out a false flag bomb attack on an immigrant hostel in Cagnes-sur-Mer, France, killing one person and injuring 12. Most of the hostel's guests are Tunisians, but the sole fatality from the attack is George Iordachescu, a Romanian exile. The bombers leave behind leaflets bearing Stars of David and claim responsibility in the name of the so-called "Masada, Action and Defense Movement" to imply that Jewish terrorists are to blame.
 In the 1988 Sri Lankan presidential election, Ranasinghe Premadasa is elected President of Sri Lanka with 50.43% of the vote.
 Born: Casey Burgess, Australian television personality and singer (Hi-5); in Sydney, New South Wales, Australia
 Mami Matsuyama, Japanese gravure idol, singer and actress; in Aomori Prefecture, Japan
 Alexis Sánchez, Chilean footballer; in Tocopilla, Chile
 Peter Winn, English semi-professional footballer; in Grimsby, England
 Died: Robert Bernstein, 69, American comic book writer, playwright and concert impresario, heart failure

December 20, 1988 (Tuesday)
 The United Nations Convention Against Illicit Traffic in Narcotic Drugs and Psychotropic Substances is signed at Vienna.
 The three-month-old daughter of the Duke and Duchess of York is christened Beatrice Elizabeth Mary.
Trooper Johnny Montague Edrington of the Kentucky State Police is shot and killed with his own handgun during a traffic stop on Highway 80 west of London, Kentucky. His body is found in a ditch.  the suspects will not yet have been apprehended.
 Died: Max Robinson, 49, American broadcast journalist, first African American network news anchor in the United States, complications from AIDS

December 21, 1988 (Wednesday)
 Soviet cosmonauts Titov and Manarov and French spationaut Chrétien return safely to Earth from Mir aboard Soyuz TM-6, nearly 366 days after Titov and Manarov launched to Mir aboard Soyuz TM-4. Titov and Manarov set a new record for the longest human spaceflight.
 Soviet test pilot Alexander Galunenko makes the first flight of the heaviest aircraft ever built, the Antonov An-225 Mriya. The An-225 was built to transport the Soviet spaceplane Buran.
 Pan Am Flight 103 is blown up over Lockerbie, Scotland, by a bomb hidden inside a radio-cassette player in one of the plane's luggage compartments, killing a total of 270 people (259 passengers and crew and 11 people on the ground). Libya is suspected of involvement. The victims of the bombing include:
 James MacQuarrie, 55, Captain
 Raymond R. Wagner, 52, First Officer
 Jerry Avritt, 46, Flight Engineer
 Michael S. Bernstein, 36, Assistant Deputy Director, Office of Special Investigations (United States Department of Justice)
 Bernt Carlsson, 50, Swedish social democrat and diplomat, Assistant-Secretary-General of the United Nations, United Nations Commissioner for Namibia
 Peter Dix, 35, Irish Olympic sailor
 David Dornstein, 25, American writer, subject of his brother Ken Dornstein's memoir The Boy Who Fell Out of the Sky
 James Fuller, 50, American automobile executive
 Matthew Gannon, 34, American Central Intelligence Agency officer
 Paul Jeffreys, 36, English rock musician, and his wife, Rachel Jeffreys, 23
 Ronald Albert Lariviere, 33, Special Agent, Diplomatic Security Service (United States Department of State)
 Charles McKee, US intelligence officer
 Daniel Emmett O'Connor, 31, Special Agent, Diplomatic Security Service (United States Department of State)
 Flora Swire, 23, daughter of Jim Swire, English physician who will become known for his activism in the bombing's aftermath
 American multinational investment bank Drexel Burnham Lambert agrees to plead guilty to insider trading and other violations and pay penalties of US$650 million.
 Born: Danny Duffy, American Major League Baseball pitcher; in Goleta, California
 Perri Shakes-Drayton, English Olympic track and field athlete; in Stepney, Greater London, England
 Died: Eithne Dunne, 69, Irish actress
 Ian Bruce Ferguson DSO, MC, 71, Australian Army officer
 Willie Kamm, 88, American Major League Baseball third baseman
 Charles Edward Peek, 84, New Zealand teacher, child welfare administrator and billiards player
 Bob Steele (born Robert Adrian Bradbury), 82, American actor, emphysema
 Nikolaas Tinbergen, 81, Dutch ornithologist, recipient of the Nobel Prize in Physiology or Medicine
 Venus Xtravaganza, 23, American transgender performer, murdered

December 22, 1988 (Thursday)
 In Figueras, Spain, 84-year-old artist Salvador Dalí is hospitalized after vomiting blood from an intestinal lesion. He will be released from the hospital on December 25. Dalí will die of heart failure on January 23, 1989.
 The day after the death of Bernt Carlsson, the United Nations Commissioner for Namibia, in the Pan Am Flight 103 bombing,, cited in  representatives of Angola, Cuba and South Africa sign the Tripartite Accord, granting independence to Namibia from South Africa and ending the direct involvement of foreign troops in the Angolan Civil War. Afonso Van-Dunem of Angola, Isidoro Malmierca Peoli of Cuba and Pik Botha of South Africa sign the accords at the headquarters of the United Nations in New York City. Botha and other South African officials had been booked to fly to New York on Flight 103 but cancelled their bookings.
 At the Venustiano Carranza penitentiary in Tepic, Mexico, prisoners denied Christmas parole begin a violent uprising, taking employees and visiting relatives hostage. About 10 inmates try to storm the office of prison warden Samuel Alvarado, killing him in a shootout.
 A tugboat towing a fuel-oil barge to Grays Harbor, Washington strikes the barge, spilling  of oil. Oil comes ashore along a  stretch from Grays Harbor to Ocean Shores, Washington. This is the third oil spill in five years near Christmas in Western Washington.
 Born: Leigh Halfpenny, Welsh rugby union player; in Gorseinon, Swansea, Wales
 Died: Gerhard Adler, 84, German analytical psychologist This source gives Adler's date of death as 23 December 1988.
 Jack Bowden, 72, Irish cricketer and field hockey player
 Chico Mendes (born Francisco Alves Mendes Filho), 44, Brazilian environmental activist, murdered
 Vincent Sattler, 19, French footballer, traffic collision

December 23, 1988 (Friday)
 In Liaoning, China, an express passenger train collides at a crossing with a bus filled with peasants, killing at least 46 people.
 The National Hockey League and the National Hockey League Players Association deny a December 22 report in The Moscow News that the league had invited the Soviet Union to create an NHL team.
 A propane tank truck explodes on a ramp at an interstate interchange in Memphis, Tennessee, causing nine deaths of motorists and neighboring residents.
 Salvadoran Civil War: Leftist rebels set off four car bombs near the San Salvador headquarters of the Joint Chiefs of Staff and the Defense Ministry; they also launch bombs over the walls of the compound by catapult. Three civilians are killed in the attack and 38 people are wounded.
 In the 1988 Independence Bowl, played at Independence Stadium in Shreveport, Louisiana, the Southern Miss Golden Eagles defeat the UTEP Miners by a score of 38–18. Golden Eagles quarterback Brett Favre comments, "We really whipped a good team tonight. We did it on TV, too. We should be a Top 20 team. We deserve it."
 The prison uprising in Tepic, Mexico, ends with at least 22 people dead. Commandos storm the prison twice; during the first raid, Jorge Armando Duarte, the leader of a commando team, tries to talk the prisoners into surrendering and is shot and killed in response. The second raid successfully quells the uprising.
 Born: Mallory Hagan, American beauty pageant contestant and politician, Miss America 2013; in Memphis, Tennessee
 Siyabonga Nhlapo, South African footballer; in Soweto, South Africa
 Died: Carlo Scorza, 91, Italian National Fascist Party politician

December 24, 1988 (Saturday)
 Nanjing anti-African protests: At Hohai University in Nanjing, China, two African students attending a Christmas Eve university dance refuse to register the names of the Chinese women accompanying them. The ensuing dispute becomes an overnight melee in which 13 people are injured. For seven hours, Chinese students throw rocks and bottles at dormitories occupied by African students. The event marks the beginning of anti-African protests that will last into January and are a precursor of later pro-democracy protests in China.
 PLO leaders meet at Yasser Arafat's home outside Baghdad, Iraq, to discuss forming a government for a Palestinian state.
 Queen Elizabeth II breaks precedent by broadcasting a second Christmas message to comfort those suffering after the Armenian earthquake, the Clapham Junction rail crash and the Pan Am Flight 103 bombing.
 Presidential transition of George H. W. Bush: U.S. President-elect Bush nominates Elizabeth Dole to be United States Secretary of Labor.
 27-year-old Susan Dzialowy dies after reentering her burning apartment on the Southwest Side of Chicago, Illinois, to save her three children, unaware that they have already escaped.
 In northern Indiana, six members of one family and a fiancée are killed in a traffic accident while traveling to a Christmas celebration.
 At Fort Pierre National Grassland in South Dakota, Governor George S. Mickelson is thrown off a snowmobile into a ravine, breaking his collarbone and four ribs. He is hospitalized in serious condition at St. Mary's Hospital in Pierre, South Dakota.
 U.S. President Reagan telephones four members of the United States Armed Forces in different parts of the world with Christmas greetings.
 Florida State cornerback Deion Sanders is arrested after an incident at a gift shop in Fort Myers, Florida and charged with battery on an auxiliary police officer and disorderly conduct. He is released after posting a $2600 bond.
 In the 1988 Sun Bowl, played at the Sun Bowl in El Paso, Texas, the Alabama Crimson Tide defeat the Army Cadets by a score of 29–28.
 In fiction, the events of the movie Die Hard take place on the night of December 24–25, 1988.
 Born: Stefanos Athanasiadis, Greek footballer; in Lakkorna, Kallikrateia, Chalkidiki, Central Macedonia, Greece
 Piyush Chawla, Indian cricketer; in Aligarh, Uttar Pradesh, India
 Emre Özkan, Turkish footballer; in Üsküdar, Istanbul, Turkey
 Simon Zenke, Nigerian footballer; in Kaduna, Nigeria
 Died: Jainendra Kumar, 83, Indian writer, two years after paralytic attack
 Noel Willman, 70, Northern Irish actor and theater director

December 25, 1988 (Sunday)
 Communist rebellion in the Philippines: In Malinao village, southeast of Manila, Communist rebels free six Philippine soldiers captured on September 25 and 28.
 Nanjing anti-African protests: Over 2000 Chinese students arrive on the Hohai University campus at noon and again throw rocks and bottles at the African students' dormitories. They then march to other campuses and throw rocks and bottles at dormitories also housing African students.
 In the early morning hours of Christmas, fires at three abortion clinics in Dallas, Texas, raise suspicions of arson by anti-abortion activists.
 Also in the early morning hours, Lieutenant Thurman Earl Sharp of the Marion County, Indiana Sheriff's Office is working the late shift at a second employment job to allow another officer to be with his family on Christmas Eve. He interrupts a gun store burglary in progress, is shot and killed and left at a remote building entrance; his patrol car is hidden behind a dumpster. The day shift relief officer discovers his body.  Sharp's murder will remain unsolved.
 At about 4 a.m., former University of North Carolina running back Derrick Fenner is shot in the chest in a parking lot outside a Southwest Washington, D.C. nightclub after an altercation inside the club. He is released from the hospital the same day.
 A fire destroys the 70-year-old United Methodist Church in Ware Shoals, South Carolina, a few hours after Christmas services.
 The Lonquimay volcano in Chile erupts for the first time since 1889, forcing the evacuation of the town of Malalcahuello.
 In the 1988 Aloha Bowl, played at Aloha Stadium in Honolulu, Hawaii, the Washington State Cougars defeat the Houston Cougars by a score of 24–22.
 On Christmas night, an Amtrak train derails in Glenwood Canyon, east of Glenwood Springs, Colorado, stranding over 300 passengers. There are no reported injuries.
 Born: Eric Gordon, National Basketball Association player; in Indianapolis, Indiana
 Lukas Hinds-Johnson, German rugby union player
 Joãozinho (born João Natailton Ramos dos Santos), Brazilian-Russian footballer; in Umbaúba, Brazil
 Marco Mengoni, Italian singer-songwriter; in Ronciglione, Province of Viterbo, Italy
 Lukas Autry Nelson, American vocalist and guitarist; in Austin, Texas
 Died: Cornelis Eecen, 90, Dutch Olympic rower
 Evgeny Golubev, 78, Soviet Russian composer
 W. F. Grimes , 83, Welsh archaeologist
 Edward Pelham-Clinton, 10th Duke of Newcastle, 68, English lepidopterist
 Shōhei Ōoka, 79, Japanese novelist and literary critic

December 26, 1988 (Monday)
 Nanjing anti-African protests: About 130 African students seek shelter at the central railway station in Nanjing, hoping to travel to Beijing. Meanwhile, about 1000 Chinese protestors march through the streets decrying China's preferential treatment of foreigners. Several thousand Chinese protesters shouting anti-African slogans gather at the train station later in the day. The protests are motivated partly by unfounded rumors that a Chinese person was killed in the disturbance on the night of December 24. In the evening, police place the African students on buses and they are driven away.
 The assassination of Indian politician Vangaveeti Mohana Ranga in Vijayawada sparks 60 hours of caste-based rioting in coastal districts of Andhra Pradesh, in which Kapus target Kamma-owned businesses for looting and burning. Over 42 people are killed in the violence.
 Born: Marco Canola, Italian racing cyclist; in Vicenza, Italy
 Cicinho (born Neuciano de Jesus Gusmão), Brazilian-Bulgarian footballer; in Belém, Pará, Brazil
 Lucas Deaux, French footballer; in Reims, France
 Guy Edi, Ivorian-French basketball player; in Agboville, Ivory Coast
 Shiho Ogawa, Japanese footballer; in Kashima, Ibaraki, Japan
 Kayo Satoh, Japanese model and television personality; in Aichi Prefecture, Japan
 Etien Velikonja, Slovenian footballer; in Šempeter pri Gorici, Socialist Republic of Slovenia, SFR Yugoslavia
 Mariaesthela Vilera, Venezuelan Olympic track cyclist; in Valle de la Pascua, Venezuela
 Wang Meiyin, Chinese cyclist; in Qufu, China
 Died: Herluf Bidstrup, 76, Danish cartoonist and illustrator
 Julanne Johnston, 88, American silent film actress
 John Loder (born William John Muir Lowe), 90, British-American actor
 Glenn McCarthy, 81, American businessman
 Vangaveeti Mohana Ranga, 41, Indian politician, assassinated
 Pablo Sorozábal, 91, Spanish composer
 Otto Zdansky, 94, Austrian paleontologist

December 27, 1988 (Tuesday)
 Near Munshiganj, Bangladesh, a cargo vessel rams the ferry Hasail from behind, causing it to sink; at least 200 people are killed.
 Bulgaria lifts its ban on Radio Free Europe.
 34-year-old Brazilian footballer Enéas de Camargo (aka Enéas) dies of pneumonia two days before his scheduled release from a São Paulo hospital where he is being treated for injuries from an August 22 car accident.
 In a bout in Fort Myers, Florida, American boxer Bobby Czyz defeats Mike Devito by knockout in the seventh round.
 Born: Hera Hilmar (born Hera Hilmarsdóttir), Icelandic actress; in Reykjavík, Iceland
 Zavon Hines, Jamaican-English footballer and coach; in Kingston, Jamaica
 Ok Taec-yeon, South Korean actor and singer (2PM); in Seoul, South Korea
 Rick Porcello, American Major League Baseball pitcher; in Morristown, New Jersey
 Hayley Williams, American singer (Paramore); in Meridian, Mississippi
 Died: Hal Ashby, 59, American film director
 William Fea, 90, New Zealand physician and rugby union and squash player
 Maha Thiri Thudhamma Khin Kyi, 76, Burmese politician and diplomat, stroke
 Jess Oppenheimer, 75, American radio and television producer, head writer and producer of I Love Lucy, heart failure due to complications from intestinal surgery
 Tecwyn Roberts, 63, Welsh aerospace engineer

December 28, 1988 (Wednesday)
 The Presidium of the Supreme Soviet of the Soviet Union establishes the Order "For Personal Courage", the last new order established in the Soviet Union before its collapse.
 Four people are killed and 17 injured in a hotel fire in La Roche-sur-Yon, France.
 In Santa Clara, Cuba, the Che Guevara Mausoleum is inaugurated on the 30th anniversary of the beginning of the Battle of Santa Clara, with Raúl Castro, Minister of the Revolutionary Armed Forces, in attendance.
 The horse Distant Power throws jockey Pat Valenzuela shortly after the start of a race at Santa Anita Park in Arcadia, California. Valenzuela suffers a concussion and facial fractures and is hospitalized.
 In a bout in Bakersfield, California, American boxer George Foreman defeats American David Jaco by knockout at 2:03 of the first round.
 Born: Islambek Albiev, Russian Olympic champion Greco-Roman wrestler; in Grozny, Checheno-Ingush Autonomous Soviet Socialist Republic, Russian SFSR, Soviet Union
 Balal Arezou, Afghan footballer; in Kabul, Afghanistan
 Inès Boubakri, Tunisian Olympic fencer; in Tunis, Tunisia
 Jordy Buijs, Dutch footballer; in South Holland, Netherlands
 Katlyn Chookagian, American mixed martial artist; in Quakertown, Pennsylvania
 Laganja Estranja (born Jay Jackson), American choreographer and drag queen; in Dallas, Texas
 Ched Evans, Welsh footballer; in Denbighshire, Wales
 Elfyn Evans, Welsh rally driver; in Dolgellau, Wales
 Florrie (born Florence Ellen Arnold), English pop singer-songwriter; in Bristol, England
 Kohei Kameyama, Japanese Olympic artistic gymnast; in Sendai, Miyagi Prefecture, Japan
 Enrica Merlo, Italian volleyball player; in Este, Veneto, Italy
 Nsima Peter, Nigerian footballer
 Perri Pierre, American filmmaker and actor; in Brooklyn, New York City
 Martina Pretelli, Sammarinese track and field athlete; in Borgo Maggiore, San Marino
 Adam Sarota, Australian footballer; in Gordonvale, Queensland, Australia
 Dzmitry Shershan, Belarusian Olympic judoka; in Navapolatsk, Byelorussian Soviet Socialist Republic, Soviet Union
 Abdou Razack Traoré, Burkinabe footballer; in Abidjan, Ivory Coast
 Died: Karlfried Graf Dürckheim, 92, German diplomat, psychotherapist and Zen master
 Björn Kurtén, 64, Finnish vertebrate paleontologist
 Vittoria Titomanlio, 89, Italian politician

December 29, 1988 (Thursday)
 Corazon Aquino, President of the Philippines, appoints Jose Ong to succeed Bienvenido Tan as Tax Commissioner.
 Li Menghua, China's Minister of Physical Culture and Sports, loses his job, reportedly due to the poor performance of the Chinese team at the 1988 Summer Olympics in Seoul, South Korea.
 In Orlando, Soweto, South Africa, a group of people acting on the instructions of Winnie Madikizela-Mandela abduct four youths from a Methodist manse run by the Reverend Paul Verryn. The kidnappers, including Jerry Richardson, John Morgan, Katiza Cebekhulu, Xoliswa Falati and members of the Mandela United Football Club, abduct Thabiso Mono, Pelo Mekgwe, Kenneth Kgase and Stompie Seipei due to unfounded allegations that Verryn has sexually abused youths resident at the manse. They take the boys to Madikizela-Mandela's residence in Diepkloof Extension, where Richardson, Cebekhulu, Falati, MUFC members and Madikizela-Mandela herself assault the youths. Seipei is falsely accused of being a police informer and is assaulted most severely of the four. He will be murdered on January 1, 1989; the other three youths will be released in January.
 In response to the December 21 bombing of Pan Am Flight 103, the Federal Aviation Administration announces new security measures to take effect within 48 hours for all U.S. airlines at European and Middle Eastern airports.
 In the 1988 All-American Bowl, played at Legion Field in Birmingham, Alabama, the Florida Gators defeat the Illinois Fighting Illini by a score of 14–10. Florida running back Emmitt Smith is named the game's MVP.
 In the 1988 Freedom Bowl, played at Anaheim Stadium in Anaheim, California, the BYU Cougars defeat the Colorado Buffaloes by a score of 20–17.
 Former Philippine president Ferdinand Marcos is again hospitalized at St. Francis Medical Center in Honolulu for treatment of congestive heart failure and possible pneumonia.
 Born: Eric Berry, National Football League safety; in Atlanta, Georgia
 Christen Press, American professional and Olympic soccer player; in Los Angeles, California
 Ágnes Szávay, Hungarian professional and Olympic tennis player; in Kiskunhalas, Hungary
 Died: Émile Aillaud, 86, French architect
 Mike Beuttler, 48, British Formula One driver, complications from AIDS
 Sir Ieuan Maddock , 71, Welsh nuclear scientist

December 30, 1988 (Friday)
 Soviet news agency TASS reports that the Russian Orthodox Church will allow members of the clergy to run for office in the upcoming March 26 elections for the Congress of People's Deputies of the Soviet Union.
 Branko Mikulić, the Prime Minister of Yugoslavia, submits a letter of resignation for himself and the 30 members of his Cabinet due to the country's economic problems, the first such resignation since communist rule began in 1945.
 The Czechoslovak prototype aircraft L-610M makes its first flight. This source gives the date of the Let L-610's first flight as December 28, 1988.
 Iran–Contra affair: Oliver North's legal team subpoenas U.S. President Reagan and President-elect Bush as defense witnesses in the retired Marine lieutenant colonel's trial on charges of conspiracy and theft.
 In the 1988 Holiday Bowl, played at Jack Murphy Stadium in San Diego, California, the Oklahoma State Cowboys defeat the Wyoming Cowboys by a score of 62–14.
 Born: Maria Apostolidi, Greek Olympic artistic gymnast; in Athens, Greece
 Leon Jackson, Scottish singer; in Whitburn, West Lothian, Scotland
 Cameron Long, American professional basketball player; in Palm Bay, Florida
 Kirsty-Leigh Porter, English actress; in Manchester, England
 Died: Yuli Daniel, 63, Soviet writer, poet and dissident, stroke
 Takeo Fujisawa, 78, Japanese businessman, co-founder of Honda, heart attack
 Isamu Noguchi, 84, Japanese-American artist and landscape architect, heart failure

December 31, 1988 (Saturday)
 In the 1988 Peach Bowl (December), played at Atlanta–Fulton County Stadium in Atlanta, Georgia, the NC State Wolfpack defeat the Iowa Hawkeyes by a score of 28–23.

 The Chicago Bears defeat the Philadelphia Eagles by a score of 20–12 in an NFC Divisional Playoff Game at Soldier Field in Chicago, Illinois. The game will become known as the Fog Bowl due to the adverse weather conditions in which it was played.
 Shortly before midnight on New Year's Eve, the tourist boat Bateau Mouche IV capsizes near Copacabana Beach in Rio de Janeiro, Brazil, with the loss of 55 lives.
 Born: Matthew Atkinson, American actor and musician; in Marietta, Georgia
 Luca Ceci, Italian track cyclist; in Ascoli Piceno, Marche, Italy
 Cristian Coimbra, Bolivian footballer; in Santa Cruz de la Sierra, Bolivia
 Álex Colomé, Dominican Major League Baseball pitcher; in Santo Domingo, Distrito Nacional, Dominican Republic
 Edvin Kanka Ćudić (born Edvin Ćudić), Bosnian human rights activist and martial artist; in Brčko, SR Bosnia and Herzegovina, SFR Yugoslavia
 Tijan Jaiteh, Gambian footballer; in Bwiam, Gambia
 Kyle Johnson, Canadian-born British Olympic basketball player; in Scarborough, Toronto, Ontario, Canada
 Konan Serge Kouadio, Ivorian footballer; in Abidjan, Ivory Coast
 Joel Martínez, Andorran footballer; in Escaldes-Engordany, Andorra
 Mira Rai, Nepalese trail runner and skyrunner
 Michal Řepík, Czech professional ice hockey left winger; in Vlašim, Czechoslovakia
 Alain Traoré, Burkinabé footballer; in Bobo-Dioulasso, Burkina Faso
 Enrique Triverio, Argentine footballer; in Aldao, Santa Fe, Argentina
 Ely Cheikh Voulany, Mauritanian footballer; in Nouakchott, Mauritania
 Died:'''
 Yara Amaral, 52, Brazilian actress, in sinking of Bateau Mouche IV''
 Sir Christopher Andrewes , 92, British virologist
 Oliver L. Austin, 85, American ornithologist
 Nicolas Calas (pseudonym for Nikos Kalamaris), 81, Greek-American poet and art critic, heart failure

References

1988
December 1988 events
1988-12
1988-12